The Visitor is a 2022 American psychological horror film directed by Justin P. Lange and written by Adam Mason and Simon Boyes. The film stars Finn Jones and Jessica McNamee. Jason Blum serves as an executive producer through his Blumhouse Television banner. 

The film was released digitally on October 7, 2022, by Epix and Paramount Home Entertainment.

Plot
When Robert and his wife move to her childhood home, he discovers an old portrait in the attic of a man who looks just like him. He soon travels down a frightening rabbit hole as he tries to discover the true identity of his mysterious doppelgänger, only to realize that every family has its own terrifying secrets.

Cast
 Finn Jones as Robert Burrows
 Jessica McNamee as Maia Eden
 Dane Rhodes as Joseph Ellis
 Donna Biscoe as Margaret Delacroix
 Thomas Francis Murphy as Maxwell Braun

Production
In October 2021, The Visitor was announced as part of Blumhouse Television and Epix's TV movie deal, with Justin P. Lange directing with Adam Mason and Simon Boyes writing the screenplay, with Finn Jones and Jessica McNamee starring in the film.

Release
The film was released digitally in the United States by Epix and Paramount Home Entertainment on October 7, 2022.

Critical response

References

External links
 

2022 films
2022 horror films
2020s American films
2020s English-language films
2020s psychological horror films
American psychological horror films
Blumhouse Productions films
Films about lookalikes
MGM+ original films